Lawrence L. Langer (born 1929) is an American scholar, Holocaust analyst, and professor of English and Holocaust education.

Early life and education
Lawrence L. Langer is U.S. scholar of Holocaust literature and professor of English emeritus at Simmons College in Boston. He was born to Irving and Esther (Strauss) Langer in the Bronx, New York in 1929. He received his BA from City College of New York in 1951 and an MA (1952) and PhD (1961) from Harvard University. He married his wife, Sondra, in 1951, and together they have two children, five grandchildren, and two great grandchildren. They currently live in Wellesley, Massachusetts.

Biography

Career Beginnings 
Langer’s interest in the Holocaust began in 1963, after he received a Fulbright grant to teach American literature at the University of Graz in Austria.  In May 1964 he drove with an American colleague through Czechoslovakia to Poland and spent two days at Auschwitz, inspecting the main camp (with several Soviet soldiers) and the remains of the killing facilities at Birkenau. After this trip, Langer began exploring the imaginative literature written about the concentration and death camp experiences. Upon his return to Simmons College he introduced a seminar on the Literature of Atrocity, versions of which he taught for the next 25 years. In 1968-69 he took a sabbatical year in Munich, Germany, where he completed his first book on Holocaust literature, “The Holocaust and the Literary Imagination.”

Career 
Lawrence L. Langer began teaching at the University of Connecticut in 1957 and moved to Simmons College in 1958, where he remained until his retirement in 1992. In 1965 Langer became the first professor in the United States to teach a course on Holocaust literature, which he initially titled ‘The Literature of Atrocity.’  In 1976 he was awarded the Alumnae Endowed Chair, and in the Fall of 2002 he was the Strassler Distinguished Visiting Professor in the Center for Holocaust and Genocide Studies at Clark University.  Presently, Langer remains the Alumnae Chair Professor of English, emeritus.

A major theme in Langer’s work over the years derives from his skepticism regarding efforts to deflect attention from the atrocities of the Holocaust by stressing the role of resistance and rescue in the ordeal of European Jewry. In his writing he understands and deplores the need to extract some positive meaning from a destructive event like the Holocaust, and argues that the impulse to learn something of value from the Holocaust experience may represent nothing more than an unconscious desire to avoid confronting its brutal realities. In Versions of Survival he established the idea of “choiceless choice” to describe the disintegration of moral reality for camp inmates and the general unprecedented situations of conflict that Jews found themselves in during the Holocaust. Additionally, he also developed the notion of an “afterdeath” of the Holocaust to accompany the “afterlife” that most survivors returned to with admirable resilience following liberation. His writing shares the essential historical reality of the Holocaust by describing the event as a story of mass murder, and challenges the belief that the Holocaust sanctifies the dignity of the human spirit.

In recent years, Langer has collaborated with the artist and child Holocaust survivor Samuel Bak in a series of volumes that combine critical commentary and interpretation with paintings whose vivid visual imagery seeks to challenge the difficult task of finding spiritual and intellectual comfort in a disordered Post-Holocaust world.

With the publication of Sexual Violence against Jewish Women during the Holocaust by Sonja Hedgepeth, CNN carried an article that included Langer stating "I have no doubt that some women were raped... [though] the significance [or rate] of rape is small," with Langer stating the low rate being due to the Nazi racial hygiene indoctrination, brothels in each concentration camp which 'aryan' women from the surrounding environs visited and the risk of typhoid and disease. Langer's statements and view, derived from testimony interviews, is supported by Lenore Weitzman and Myrna Goldenberg with all three contributing in various degrees, to the similar book Women in the Holocaust.

Awards 
Langer received an NEH Fellowship for Independent Studies and Research between 1978 and 1979. Between September and December 1996, he was the JB & Maurice Senior Scholar-in-Residence at the US Holocaust Research Center of the Holocaust Museum in Washington, DC.  From September to December 1997, Lawrence L. Langer was named as a Koerner Fellow for the Study of the Holocaust, Oxford Center for Hebrew and Jewish Studies, Yarnton Manor, Oxford, England (1997).  In May 2003, Langer served as the Resident Scholar at the Rockefeller Foundation Study and Conference Center in Bellagio, Italy.  In 1996, Lawrence L. Langer was awarded the honorary degree, Doctor of Humane Letters from Simmons College, which he also received in 2000 from Hebrew Union College in Los Angeles and in 2002 from Ohio Wesleyan University.
In 2016, Langer received The Holocaust Educational Foundation's Distinguished Achievement Award in Holocaust Studies.

Selected publications
Told and Foretold: The Cup in the Art of Samuel Bak (2013)
The Quest for Identity: Adam and Eve in the Art of Samuel Bak (2013)
Return to Vilna in the Art of Samuel Bak (2007)
Using and Abusing the Holocaust (2006)
Samuel Bak: New Perceptions of Old Appearances (2005)
In a Different Light: The Book of Genesis in the Art of Samuel Bak (2001)
The Game Continues: Chess in the Art of Samuel Bak (1999)
Preempting the Holocaust (1998)
Landscapes of Jewish Experience: Paintings by Samuel Bak (1997)
Art from the Ashes: A Holocaust Anthology (1995)
Admitting the Holocaust: Collected Essays (1995)
Holocaust Testimonies: The Ruins of Memory (1991) - winner of the 1991 National Book Critics Circle Award for Criticism
Versions of Survival: The Holocaust and the Human Spirit (1982)
The Age of Atrocity: Death in Modern Literature (1978)
The Holocaust and the Literary Imagination (1975)

References

External links 
 https://www.jewishvirtuallibrary.org/jsource/judaica/ejud_0002_0012_0_11861.html
 https://www.facinghistory.org/for-educators/educator-resources/resource-collections/illuminations/introduction-professor-lawrence-l-langer

1929 births
Simmons University faculty
Living people
City College of New York alumni
Harvard University alumni
Literary scholars